Udo Hessels (born 25 August 1965) is a Dutch sailor who has competed in four Paralympics games winning silver in 2004 and gold in 2012 both in the three person keelboat the sonar.

References

External links
 
 

1965 births
Living people
Dutch disabled sportspeople
Dutch male sailors (sport)
Sonar class world champions
Disabled sailing world champions
World champions in sailing for the Netherlands
Paralympic sailors of the Netherlands
Paralympic medalists in sailing
Paralympic gold medalists for the Netherlands
Sailors at the 1996 Summer Paralympics
Sailors at the 2000 Summer Paralympics
Sailors at the 2004 Summer Paralympics
Sailors at the 2012 Summer Paralympics